Agassi Tennis Generation is a tennis sports game, developed by Aqua Pacific and published by DreamCatcher Interactive for Microsoft Windows, PlayStation 2 and Game Boy Advance. The game features former tennis player Andre Agassi.

Gameplay
In the PlayStation 2 version, the game features 16 tournaments and 12 courts. It has various court surfaces and three game modes: Quick Match, Arcade and Championship. There are 32 tennis players with varying abilities in speed, strength, and stamina. Championship offers players 10,000 dollars and a number of choices on which to spend it, e.g. coaches, personal trainers, talent agents etc.

Each individual can help improve an athlete's abilities in specific areas over time. Quick Match drops players onto a court for a single match, while Arcade is designed to offer players a more simplified control scheme. Championship has players competing against a series of fictitious opponents on each of the 12 courts to win prize money. The PlayStation 2 version of the game features motion-capture animation from Agassi himself.

In the Game Boy Advance version, there are four modes: Quick Match, Arcade, Championship, and Multiplayer Multipack, which requires a link cable, another Game Boy Advance, and another copy of the game. Gamers choose from ten tennis player characters to compete in both single and double matches in courts set in the UK, France, Germany, Australia, Italy and the United States.

Reception

The PlayStation 2 version received "mixed" reviews according to the review aggregation website Metacritic. Game Chronicles editor Mark Smith criticized the game for its "total lack of practice modes, mini-games, or tutorials" but stating that fans of the genre "will appreciate the slick interface, fluid controls, and realistic gameplay". GameSpot's Ryan Davis criticized the game for its "short list of options, buggy gameplay, and generally tepid presentation".

The PC version received mixed reviews, with Steve Hill of PC Zone stating "Reviewing this on a borderline minimum spec PC, it proved to be muck of the highest order, with the computer controlled players largely incapable of hitting the ball, rendering matches little more than a banal sequence of unlikely aces and tedious double faults" despite the fact that the A.I. players are "able to return serves and take part in vaguely competitive rallies" on a slightly more powerful PC.

References

External links
"Agassi's Generation" from IGN

2002 video games
Cryo Interactive games
Cultural depictions of Andre Agassi
DreamCatcher Interactive games
Game Boy Advance games
Multiplayer and single-player video games
PlayStation 2 games
Tennis video games
Video games developed in the United Kingdom
Video games based on real people
Windows games
Aqua Pacific games